General Rodolfo Sánchez Taboada International Airport  is an international airport located outside Mexicali, Baja California, Mexico, near the U.S.-Mexico border. It is the northernmost airport in Mexico. It is named after Mexican military officer, politician and former Governor of Baja California .

Information 
The General Rodolfo Sánchez Taboada International Airport is located 20 kilometres east of the city of Mexicali. The airport is 535 hectares in area, with an asphalt runway 2600 metres long and 45 metres wide, designed to handle aircraft such as the Boeing 737, Boeing 757 and Airbus A320. It has two taxiways, 385 and 460 metres long by 23 metres wide.

The airport has two aprons, one for commercial aviation, made of hydraulic concrete with three parking positions; and another for general aviation, made of asphalt, with 24 parking positions and three helipads. It also has a building for Aircraft Rescue and Firefighting, a machinery room, visual aids, control tower, three hangars and a water treatment plant.

In 2020 it handled 1,094,000 passengers and in 2021, it handled 1,298,900 passengers, an increase of 18.73%.

Airlines and destinations

Destinations map

Statistics

Passengers

Busiest routes

Gallery

See also

 List of the busiest airports in Mexico
 2012 Boeing 727 crash experiment, involving a Boeing 727 that took off from General Rodolfo Sánchez Taboada International Airport, to be deliberately crashed for the purpose of making a television show.

References

External links

Airports in Baja California
Mexicali